The 2008 American Samoa Republican presidential caucuses took place on February 23, 2008. John McCain won all 6 pledged (and the support of 3 unpledged delegates) at the territory's convention.  McCain "campaigned" in the territory by recording an audio message to the delegates and sending it to the caucus via the Internet.

Results

See also
 American Samoa Democratic caucuses, 2008
 Republican Party (United States) presidential primaries, 2008

References

American Samoa
Republican caucuses
2008
February 2008 events in the United States